The Gulf of Lion or Gulf of Lions (French: golfe du Lion, Spanish: golfo de León, Italian: Golfo del Leone, Occitan: golf del/dau Leon, Catalan: golf del Lleó, Medieval Latin: sinus Leonis, mare Leonis, Classical Latin: sinus Gallicus) is a wide embayment of the Mediterranean coastline of Catalonia in Spain with Languedoc-Roussillon and Provence in France, extending from Begur in the west to Toulon in the east.

The chief port on the gulf is Marseille. Toulon is another important port. The fishing industry in the gulf is based on hake (Merluccius merluccius), being bottom-trawled, long-lined and gill-netted and currently declining from overfishing.

Rivers that empty into the gulf include the Tech, Têt, Aude, Orb, Hérault, Vidourle, and the Rhône.

The continental shelf is exposed here as a wide coastal plain, and the offshore terrain slopes rapidly to the Mediterranean's abyssal plain. Much of the coastline is composed of lagoons and salt marsh.

This is the area of the cold, blustery winds called the Mistral and the Tramontane.

Etymology 
The current name of the gulf appeared at least during the 13th century (in medieval Latin sinus Leonis, mare Leonis) and could come from comparison with a lion: it would simply suggest that this part of the sea is as dangerous as a lion because it has very violent, surprising winds that threaten boats (sailors and fishermen know these dangers very well). This comparison with a lion is suggested by various converging sources: Deroy and Mulon's dictionary of French place names, Mistral's comprehensive Occitan dictionary, Diderot and D'Alembert's famous French encyclopedia and several texts in Latin since the 13th century.

These sources, especially Deroy and Mulon, Diderot and D'Alembert, reject the hypothesis according to which the name would be related to the city of Lyon, since it is too far from the gulf.

A former name in classical Latin during Roman antiquity was sinus Gallicus (that is, "Gallic gulf").

Geodynamics 
The Gulf of Lion is not a simple passive continental margin; it results from Oligocene-Miocene anti-clockwise rotation of the Corsican-Sardinian Block against the European Craton. This extension rejuvenated a very complex tectonic framework inherited from the Tethyan evolution and the Pyrenean orogeny. The Eocene mountain-building event that built the Pyrenees compressed and thickened the entire crust. Oil geologists predict that there will be considerable oil deposits at the seaward margins of the gulf.

Ocean dynamics 
The gulf's bottom topography, the Mistral, extended cold weather, and evaporation combine to create a sinking of surface waters which forms the Levantine Intermediate Water of the Mediterranean Sea.

Marine ecology

The Gulf of Lion is notable, according to C. Michael Hogan, for occurrences of biodiversity associated with the reef building organism Lophelia pertusa.

References

External links 
 Marine topography of the Golfe du Lion

 
Gulfs of Metropolitan France
Gulfs of the Mediterranean
Landforms of Occitania (administrative region)
Landforms of Provence-Alpes-Côte d'Azur